Minotaur is the name of different fictional characters appearing in American comic books published by Marvel Comics.

Publication history
The mythological Minotaur was adapted by Sal Buscema and Peter Gillis.

The Miklos Vryolak version of Minotaur first appeared in Iron Man #24 and was created by Archie Goodwin and Johnny Craig.

The Decimus Furius version of Minotaur first appeared in Uncanny X-Force #1 and was created by Rick Remender and Jerome Opena.

The Dario Agger version of Minotaur first appeared in Thor: God of Thunder #19.NOW and was created by Jason Aaron and Esad Ribić.

Fictional character biography

Mythological Minotaur
Based on the Greek mythology monster of the same name, the Minotaur is the offspring of Queen Pasiphe and the Bull of Poseidon which her husband King Minos didn't sacrifice at Poseidon's orders. As a result of this union, the Minotaur was born. Upon learning of the Minotaur's origin, King Minos enlisted Daedalus to construct a labyrinth to have the Minotaur placed in so that it can never escape. For several years, King Minos used his labyrinth to imprison his prisoners so that the Minotaur can kill them. One day, Theseus offered himself off as a prisoner to King Minos. With the help of Ariadne, Theseus made his way through the labyrinth and killed the Minotaur with his sword.

During his visit to Minoan Crete, Ikaris fought the Minotaur in the labyrinth.

Myklos Vryolak's father allegedly used chemicals from Greece that were associated with the Minotaur in order to turn his son into a Minotaur.

Ares later resurrected the Minotaur to serve him.

The Minotaur's corpse was later transported back to the labyrinth in Greece. Matsu'o Tsurayaba and the Hand were later led to the Minotaur's corpse by Eurystheus and Achelous where they managed to resurrect the Minotaur. When Hercules and Wolverine arrived at Matsu'o Tsurayaba's apartment, they are greeted by a video of Matsu'o, Eurystheus, and Achelous telling them about how they resurrected some Greek mythology monsters. Just then, Hercules and Wolverine are attacked by the Minotaur and the Nemean Lion. The Minotaur and the Nemean Lion knocked out Hercules before turning their attention to Wolverine. The Minotaur explained to Wolverine that his adamantium claws won't work on the Nemean Lion's invulnerable hide. After Wolverine knocked out the Nemean Lion, Hercules regained consciousness and helped Wolverine defeat the Minotaur where he seemingly fell to his death.

The Minotaur had survived the fall and had been turned to stone where his petrified body was transported back to Crete. When Deadpool came to Crete, the Minotaur broke free from his petrified state and attacked Deadpool. The Minotaur successfully destroyed the sarcophagus with Deadpool's help and Shiklah was awakened.

Species
Since the first Minotaur, there had been more Minotaurs appearing in Olympus. When Ares allied with Enchantress and stole the Ebony Blade from Black Knight, they rallied the Minotaurs, Centaurs, and Satyrs into attacking Mount Olympus. Ares' army was defeated by Hercules and the Avengers.

Myklos Vryolak

Miklos Vryolak had suffered from an unknown disease which was beyond the cure of any medicine. His father Dr. Vryolak desperately used a chemical he discovered in the ruins of the labyrinth which he used to treat his son. Miklos recovered quickly, but began to mutate into a Minotaur. Dr. Vryklos sent his son on various missions like stealing money and various other objects to finance and supply Dr. Vryklos with the means for a cure. Dr. Vryolak actually wanted to make an entire army of monsters. When Madame Masque washed up on the grottos of the Vryolaks after a fight with Midas, Dr. Vryolak stole her golden mask and sent the Minotaur into another village to gather more supplies for him. To make a mate for his son, Dr. Vryolak planned to turn Madame Masque into a Minotaur. Word of Madame Masque's mask made it to S.H.I.E.L.D. which caused Iron Man and Jasper Sitwell to go after Madame Masque. Iron Man nearly exhausted the power of his armor fighting the Minotaur, but managed to recharge his armor while sitting seemingly unconscious in a wreckage. Iron Man then followed the Minotaur back to the grotto where Jasper Sitwell had gone to free Madame Masque. Despite subduing Jasper Sitwell, the Minotaur saw that Madame Masque had the love for a human despite the fact that she is disfigured. When Iron Man arrived, the Minotaur fought him again where the battle damaged a support part of the grotto. As the cavern began to collapse, the Minotaur realized his father's true plans and saw that it was wrong to make more Minotaurs like him. The Minotaur held the ceiling up long enough for Iron Man, Jasper Sitwell, and Madame Masque to escape as the cave-in crushed him and his father.

Decimus Furius

Decimus Furius was born in Rome. After his father was forced to commit suicide for his philosophic ideas, his mother soon committed suicide as well, leaving Decimus homeless on the streets. In 281 A.D., upon starving to death, Decimus' mutant powers emerged turning him into a Minotaur-like, including horns, hooves, pointed ears, massive size and fur. He was consequently attacked and killed dozens of humans before being imprisoned. After years of imprisonment, he was sent to the Colosseum as a gladiator and battled every day for the next few years of his life for his survival and eventual freedom, and became worshiped as being the dark god Minotaur.

Decimus was watched by the eternal mutant Apocalypse and selected as his Final Horseman War in the event that all other plans of Apocalypse failed. Clan Akkaba eventually activated him to serve as a Horseman to a young clone of Apocalypse. Psylocke described its mind as "a hollow room encompassed by shadow, echoing an unquenchable lust to conquer." During a raid on a Clan Akkaba stronghold, Fantomex was able to defeat him by misdirecting War's feelings so that he thought he was in love with Psylocke. He subsequently exploded, but was fully regenerated a few instants later.

However, he still remained in love with Psylocke, taking days to collect himself mentally. When X-Force attempted to assault Clan Akkaba's lunar base, he took E.V.A. down and, along the other Horsemen, defeated them. He brought her back to his chambers and confessed his feelings. Now that his mind wasn't filled with sorrow and hate, Psylocke was able to use her telepathy to escape and find the cloned Apocalypse.

Dario Agger

Dario Agger is the CEO of Roxxon Energy Corporation. As a child, his family owned a small island in the Aegean Sea which was attacked by gunmen. Agger fled to a small cave in which he found a statue and prayed for revenge unknowingly making a pact with an unknown dark god. He strives to make as much money as possible regardless of the effects on the environment and uses Roxxon's vast financial resources to pay for lobbyists and lawyers in order to exploit and pollute as much as he wanted without consequence. He is secretly the Minotaur. One of his most frequent critics was S.H.I.E.L.D. environmental agent Rosalind Solomon. When Agent Rosalind Solomon learned that Dario and Roxxon had mined ice from Europa and were planning to sell it as well for a lot of money, Solomon decided to teach them a lesson by convincing Thor to bring an even larger chunk of ice from the realm of Jotunheim and give it away for free. Dario brushed off Thor's interference at first. Dario was forced to deal with Thor after he was motivated to fight Roxxon Energy Corporation after Agent Solomon explained the company's negative effects on the environment. Thor's first act against Roxxon Energy Corporation was to destroy some of its factories with a blast of lightning. Dario angrily asked his lawyers what they should do. When his lawyers didn't give a satisfactory answer, Dario fed some of them to bloodthirsty bears.

While Thor was away helping the Avengers, Dario got back at him for destroying his factories by building a floating island full of factories above Broxton, Oklahoma, which heavily polluted the town. Dario knew this would infuriate Thor and waited for him to appear on the floating island he built. When Thor arrived, Dario and his remaining lawyers slapped Thor with a lawsuit for destroying Roxxon's factories and with an injunction that forbade him from entering Broxton. Thor was undeterred by the injunction and snuck into Broxton looking for a way to stop Dario. Thor eventually confronted Dario as he was ordering people out of a diner he planned to tear down. That was when Dario sprang his trap. Dario had made a secret deal with Ulik that allowed him and a large group of Trolls to live beneath Broxton in exchange for attacking Thor. The Trolls attacked and killed Dario's remaining lawyers. Dario told the Trolls that they could do what they want to Broxton. Dario also revealed his true form as the Minotaur to Thor and explained that his ultimate goal was to exploit all of Earth's natural resources before moving on to a new area. The Trolls were ultimately defeated by the combined forces of the Asgardians and S.H.I.E.L.D., but Ulik was able to flee and Broxton was left in ruins. Dario pleaded ignorance to the whole incident. Through a media campaign, Dario was able to pin the Trolls' attack on Broxton on the Asgardians and their presence in the United States. After giving a speech that blasted the Asgardians, he was confronted by Agent Solomon and punched in the face. Dario threatened legal action against Solomon, but Solomon reminded Dario that he had killed off all of his lawyers. Dario later met with Ulik and asked him about the Nine Realms as he would like to exploit them next.

Following Thor Odinson's loss of his hammer following the "Original Sin" storyline, Agger came into possession of Laufey's skull and a fight ensued between him, Malekith the Accursed (who seemed to recognize the source of Agger's power and was intrigued by it), and the Frost Giants as well as the new female Thor. After the Frost Giants' defeat and Thor ending up in combat against Serpent (who was possessing the Destroyer Armor), Minotaur forged a pact with Malekith the Accursed. The pact was that when Malekith and his allies conquered a world, Roxxon Energy Corporation would be given exclusive rights to essentially strip mine it. At the same time, he revealed his past and how he became the Minotaur. Malekith convinced Minotaur to celebrate their deal in the Dark Elf way, and he teleported the two of them to Alfheim where they slaughtered various Light Elves. Then Malekith and Minotaur went to Jotunheim. Using the blood of a hundred murdered Light Elves, Malekith performed a spell that resurrected King Laufey.

As part of the All-New, All-Different Marvel, Minotaur appears as a member of the Dark Council alongside Malekith the Accursed, Ulik, Laufey, and some unnamed Fire Demons.

Dario Agger attended a meeting at the Universal Bank with Tiberius Stone of Alchemax, Wilson Fisk of Fisk Industries, Sebastian Shaw of Shaw Industries, Darren Cross of Cross Technological Enterprises, Zeke Stane of Stane International, Shingen Harada of the Yashida Corporation, Frr'dox of Shi'ar Solutions Consolidated, and Wilhelmina Kensington of Kilgore Arms. They discuss with Dario about his and Roxxon Energy Corporation's plans to exploit the Ten Realms of Asgard where he kept it secret from them. After Agger refused to offer to share that "new market" with the other company leaders, Frr'dox threatened Agger from experiencing unprecedented problems with interstellar custom. Then, Shingen Harada threatened Agger and attacked him. Before the fight between Dario Agger and Shingen Harada started, Exterminatrix of the Midas Corporation showed up and knocked out Agger while claiming that she is the new member of their group. Dario is taken hostage by Exterminatrix while Shingen Harada attacks an underwater station in the Southern Ocean, where he encounters Thor who defeats him by hitting him with her hammer several times. They later attack Roxxon Corporation HQ in order to steal from his vault. Just when Shingen opened the vault, Dario transforms into Minotaur and knocks him out. Before he could attack Exterminatrix, who just defeated S.H.I.E.L.D. agent Roz Solomon, Thor shows up and attacks them with her lighting. Then, the Agger Imperative is activated, causing the floating island where the building is to fall down. While S.H.I.E.L.D. evacuates the building, Thor destroys the island. Dario is later arrested along with the other villains.

Taking interest in Weapon H after he slew the Ur-Wendigo, Dario Agger and Roxxon Energy Corporation managed to obtain some Brood where they infected some wolves and a worker named Blake into attacking Weapon H with Blake riding an Acanti. Then Roxxon successfully captures Weapon H after his fight with Roxxon's Man-Thing. Clayton's wife Sonia and Dr. Ella Sterling free Weapon H before he can be lobotomized. After Weapon H frees Blake and Roxxon's Man-Thing and then regresses back to Clayton in the presence of Sonia Sung and Dr. Ella Sterling, Dario appears wanting them to hear him out as he explains that Roxxon is wanting to obtain extraterrestrial resources leading him to show the group a portal to Weirdworld that has magic enough to power the planet for a million years. However, the monsters on the other side want to kill every human and they can't cut the power to the portal. Following an explosion, the Skrullduggers emerge and attack the nearby humans as Dario watches Weapon H, Blake, and Man-Thing fight the Skrullduggers even when Captain America comes into view and joins the fight. As Dario states that the Skrullduggers have no protection under the Multiversal Mineral Rights Exploitation Agreement, he does introduce himself to Captain America who mentions about hearing his name before upon Thor arresting him. It was also mentioned by Dario that Roxxon has made agreements with the governing entities that they wouldn't be stepping on anyone's toes while stating that the M.M.R.E.A. makes sure that the cross-dimensional mining doesn't harm any indigenous creatures which was co-signed by 7 multinational corporations, 112 Earth-based nations, 2,334 interstellar civilizations, and 15 divine entities with the agreement also involving the fight against invasive species. After Dario has a surviving Skrulldugger specimen bombed, Captain America suggests to Weapon H that he takes up Dario's offer so that he can be Captain America's soldier on the inside. When Weapon H and Dario go to check on Blake and Man-Thing at the portal to Weirdworld 10 minutes later, they find that they have been assisted by Korg in taking a few of the Skrullduggers out. While giving in to the demands as part of the condition to fight the Skrullduggers, Dario reveals that Titania and ex-S.H.I.E.L.D. operative Angel will assist with the field mission. As Weapon H, Angel, and Blake make their way to the Roxxon outpost, Agger contacts Weapon H to check in on his mission. Weapon H thanks Dario for "showing his hand" as he explains to Angel and Blake that Dario is also wanting them to kill the Skrullduggers. When Dario contacts again, he unknowingly alerts the Skrullduggers outside the Roxxon outpost. Dario guarantees that Sonia is doing fine as Weapon H slays some Skrullduggers on his way into the Roxxon outpost.

As Morgan le Fay of Earth-15238 mind-controls Weapon H in going on the attack, Dario Agger takes control of the transmission stating they made a bad decision getting mixed up with Morgan le Fay of Earth-15238. He states to Black Widow's clone, who posed as Angel, into heading to the escape coordinates only for them to go into a box canyon so that he can manipulate the Roxxon team in using the gun that is powered by a Weirdworld Adamantine Crystal that Morgan le Fay's mystic energies in them. He also mentioned that the locals of Weirdworld would never let Roxxon mine the Adamantine Crystals anyway. Before he can order the override of the gun wielded by Dr. Carrie Espinoza which is going to explode, Dario is knocked out by Sonia who heads to Weirdworld to get to Weapon H. After breaking free from Morgan le Fay's mind-control, Weapon H briefly left Weirdworld and returned to have disarm the gun so that he would save the world and his own skin. As Dario works to disarm the gun, he claims to Dr. Carrie Ezpinosa that them being endangered on Weirdworld is part of their contracts. Once the gun is disarmed, Dario is attacked by Morgan le Fay. She and everyone present are caught by surprise when Dario transforms into Minotaur. He begins to fight Morgan le Fay when she tries to disrupt the evacuation. After everyone is evacuated, Weapon H is attacked by Minotaur who states that he ruined everything. As Morgan le Fay's army starts to charge them, Weapon H leaves through the portal stating to Minotaur "I did your job. Got your people back safe. You wanna stay over her like an idiot and fight to control a world you got no right to? You're on your own." Minotaur is then swarmed over by the Skrullduggers as he barely makes it through. As an injured Minotaur regresses to Dario, Weapon H and Sonia make sure that he pays up the fulfillment of the contract's terms. Dario does provide Clay and Sonia with money to their accounts and new identities. Clay vows that if Dario does anything to his family, he will tear down everything he has. Later that night, Dario begins his house arrest as Carpenter provides him with some nectar. He states that the contract doesn't state that Weapon H can't be harmed as he plans to manipulate Hulk and Wolverine to do the job.

Dario Agger and Roxxon collaborate with Baron Zemo in a plan to make the Hydra-occupied Bagalia be recognized as an independent nation by having Mandarin in his Tem Borjigem alias be the public face for Bagalia.

Dario Agger was hinted in a discussion between Leader and former Weapon X Project scientist Dr. Aliana Alba as someone who wants Weapon H dead.

During The War of the Realms storyline, Minotaur was present with Malekith as he begins his invasion on Midgard. Minotaur and Roxxon later take over Antarctica. During the fight at Roxxon's Antarctica HQ, Dario fights Jane Foster and Roz Solomon. When Dario's other side of Minotaur is exposed, Roxxon's stocks end up in a free fall. In the aftermath of the event, Dario avoids prosecution by claiming that he was coerced into helping in Malekith's invasion.

Hulk later attacked Roxxon's data center. In order to remedy this situation, Dario Agger went to Monster Island to recruit Xemnu. In order to draw out Hulk, Minotaur sent some monsters from Monster Island to Phoenix, Arizona where they fought Hulk, his allies, and Gamma Flight. This was part of a plan to have Xemnu rescue the locals as Hulk's Devil Hulk persona switched to the Savage Hulk persona. Minotaur has Roxxon use its media platforms to help Xemnu hypnotize people into thinking that Xemnu is the good guy who had his own TV show and Hulk is the bad guy, in exchange for allowing Xemnu to feed on Roxxon staff Minotaur deemed expendable. When Hulk and his allies attacked Roxxon HQ, Minotaur discovered Xemnu had transformed the people he fed on into Xemnu/human hybrid minions. Upon objecting to this, Xemnu consumed Minotaur and transformed him into a deformed creature unable to speak. After Hulk leaves, the Leader confronts Minotaur and advises him to leave Hulk to him.

Powers and abilities
Each of the Minotaurs possess superhuman strength.

The Miklos Vryolak version of Minotaur also has superhuman durability.

The Decimus Furius version of Minotaur also has superhuman durability and the ability to piece himself back together after exploding.

The Dario Agger version of Minotaur can also change between his human and Minotaur form and also sports superhuman durability.

In other media

Television
 A group of mythological Minotaurs appear in the Hulk and the Agents of S.M.A.S.H. episode "The Tale of Hercules". They serve as Pluto's foot soldiers in his plot to use the Shield of Minerva to turn all mortals to stone.

Film
 A mythological Minotaur appears in Hulk: Where Monsters Dwell, in Benito Serrano's nightmares.

References

External links
 Minotaur (Greek mythology) at Marvel Wiki
 Minotaur (Miklos Vryolak) at Marvel Wiki
 Minotaur (Decimus Furius) at Marvel Wiki
 Minotaur (Dario Agger) at Marvel Wiki
 Minotaur (Miklos Vryolak) at Comic Vine
 Minotaur (Dario Agger) at Comic Vine
 Minotaur (Greek mythology) at Marvel Appendix
 

Marvel Comics species
Fictional Italian people
Fictional business executives
Characters created by Archie Goodwin (comics)
Characters created by Jason Aaron
Classical mythology in Marvel Comics
Marvel Comics characters with superhuman strength
Marvel Comics supervillains
Comics characters introduced in 1974
Fictional businesspeople
Fictional characters with superhuman durability or invulnerability
Comics characters introduced in 2010
Comics characters introduced in 2014
Fictional Greek people